Wagner Moura Lamounier (born 30 April 1969) is a Brazilian economist and musician who achieved fame for having been the original vocalist of Brazilian thrash metal band Sepultura, and for having created and led the first-wave black/thrash metal band Sarcófago from 1985 until it disbanded in 2000.

Life and career
Lamounier sang briefly with Sepultura during the early part of the band's career, contributing the lyrics to the song "Antichrist" (a reference to his own moniker) featured on the band's first release Bestial Devastation. He then moved to his own band (Sarcófago) which, while less commercially successful than Sepultura, is widely hailed as a major influence on the most extreme spectrum of metal music, being revered by black, thrash and death metal fans.

Lamounier had not been active in the music industry since Sarcófago split in 2000, and he is currently a professor of economic science and applied statistics at Universidade Federal de Minas Gerais in Belo Horizonte, Brazil. Despite this, in 2012 he formed the stoner metal band The Evil, with their debut album being released in 2017.

References

1969 births
Living people
English-language singers from Brazil
Brazilian heavy metal guitarists
Brazilian male guitarists
Brazilian heavy metal singers
Brazilian economists
Brazilian people of French descent
People from Belo Horizonte
Sepultura members
Black metal singers
Black metal musicians
Death metal musicians
Rhythm guitarists